This article is a list of mass shootings in Switzerland. Mass shootings are firearm-related violence with at least four casualties.

21st century

20th century

Notes

References

Crime-related lists
Mass shootings in Switzerland